Noseweek is a South African tabloid published by Chaucer Publications that has appeared monthly since June 1993. It is best known for regular legal action against it, such as a failed bid at interdiction by banking group FirstRand (where editor Martin Welz represented himself) and defamation actions by judge Fikile Bam and former public protector Selby Baqwa.

See also
 List of satirical magazines

References

External links
 

1993 establishments in South Africa
English-language magazines published in South Africa
Magazines established in 1993
Magazines published in South Africa
Monthly magazines published in South Africa
Satirical magazines